Dagobert or Taginbert  is a Germanic male given name, possibly from Old Frankish Dag "day" and  beraht "bright". 
Alternatively, it has been identified as Gaulish dago "good" berxto "bright".

Animals 
 Roi Dagobert (born 1964), thoroughbred racehorse

People 
 Dagobert I (605–639), Frankish king
 Dagobert II (died 679), Frankish king
 Dagobert III (699–715), Frankish king
 Dagobert (d. 675), son of the Frankish king Childeric II
 Dagobert of Pisa (died 1105), Archbishop of Pisa and first Latin Patriarch of Jerusalem
 Dagobert (1222–1232), son of Louis VIII of France
 Luc Siméon Auguste Dagobert (1736–1794), French general
 Erich Dagobert von Drygalski (1865–1949), German geographer, born in Königsberg
 Dagobert Peche (1887–1923), Austrian artist and metalworker designer
 Dagobert Biermann (1904–1943), Resistance fighter against the Nazis
 Père Dagobert, Capuchin monk
 Dagobert D. Runes (1902–1982), philosopher, translator, and friend of Albert Einstein
 Dagoberto Campaneris Blanco, Major league baseball player
 Dagobert Banzio (1957–2017), Ivorian politician
 Dagobert Dang (born 1958), Cameroon footballer
 Dagobert Frey (1883–1962), Austrian art historian and thief
 Dagobert Friedländer (1826–1904), banker and politician
 Dagobert von Gerhardt (1831–1910), German soldier, poet, and novelist
 Dagobert, Archbishop of Sens
 Dagobert Thometschek, German rower

Popular culture
 Dagobert IX, a Galactic Emperor in Isaac Asimov's Foundation and Empire
 The German, Dutch and Hungarian name of Disney character Scrooge McDuck
 hence, the pseudonym of extortionist Arno Funke
 In Swedish, Norwegian and French, the cartoon character Dagwood Bumstead is named Dagobert with various surnames
 The song "Le bon roi Dagobert" (song), named after Dagobert I
 Dagobert, name of the dog in the French translation of Enid Blyton's The Famous Five books (Timmy in the original)
 Good King Dagobert, a 1984 French-Italian film directed by Dino Risi

Food
 Dagobert (sandwich), a sandwich of Belgian cuisine 

Masculine given names
Surnames of Norman origin
German masculine given names
Germanic-language surnames